Bill Cashmore may refer to:

Bill Cashmore (actor) (1961–2017), English actor and playwright, political candidate
Bill Cashmore (politician), New Zealand local government politician